La cruz de Marisa Cruces (English title:The Cross of Marisa Cruces) is a Mexican telenovela produced by Ernesto Alonso and transmitted by Teleprogramas Acapulco, SA in 1970.

Cast 
Amparo Rivelles as Marisa Cruces
Carlos Bracho as Alfredo Roldán
Noé Murayama as Guillermo Chávez
Jorge Vargas as Cristián
Otto Sirgo as Héctor
Claudia Islas as Violeta
Raquel Olmedo as Carola
Silvia Pasquel as Marisa Cruces (young)

References

External links 

Mexican telenovelas
1970 telenovelas
Spanish-language telenovelas
Televisa telenovelas
1970 Mexican television series debuts
1970 Mexican television series endings